Alonso Ruizpalacios (born 1978) is a Mexican film director.

Biography 
Ruizpalacios was born and raised in Mexico City. He studied stage directing in Mexico City, before moving to London where he trained as an actor at RADA. Ruizpalacios writes and directs for both stage and screen. His short film Café Paraíso won multiple awards on the film festival circuit. His debut feature Gueros, shot in black and white, was lauded by critics and won five Ariel Awards in 2015, including Best Picture, Best First Film and Best Director. Ruizpalacios also directed the music video for "Hasta la Raíz" by Mexican singer-songwriter Natalia Lafourcade.

He recently directed the movie Museo, starring Gael García Bernal. The film won the best script award at the Berlin International Film Festival. Museum has also been present in other international festivals. The film tells the story of the famous robbery to the National Museo of Anthropology on December 25, 1985, in Mexico City.

He has also contributed in TV series: directing two episodes for Narcos: Mexico and two episodes for the Mexican TV show Aquí en la tierra; besides being the showrunner of the XY TV show for the Mexican television network Once TV.

Selected filmography
 Güeros (2014)
 Museum (2018)
 A Cop Movie (2021)
 The Kitchen (TBA)

References

1978 births
Living people
Ariel Award winners
Best Director Ariel Award winners
Mexican directors
Silver Bear for Best Screenplay winners